Anders Torbjörn Bergström (born  in Sandviken) is a Swedish male weightlifter, competing in the +105 kg category and representing Sweden at international competitions. He participated at the 1992 Summer Olympics in the +110 kg event and at the 1996 Summer Olympics in the +108 kg event. He competed at world championships, most recently at the 1998 World Weightlifting Championships.

Major results

References

External links
 

1966 births
Living people
Swedish male weightlifters
Weightlifters at the 1996 Summer Olympics
Olympic weightlifters of Sweden
People from Sandviken Municipality
Weightlifters at the 1992 Summer Olympics
Sportspeople from Gävleborg County
20th-century Swedish people